The World Junior Alpine Skiing Championships 2003 were the 22nd World Junior Alpine Skiing Championships, held between 4–8 March 2003 in Briançonnais, France.

Medal winners

Men's events

Two gold medals were awarded in the Giant Slalom.

Women's events

External links
World Junior Alpine Skiing Championships 2003 results at fis-ski.com

World Junior Alpine Skiing Championships
2003 in alpine skiing
Alpine skiing competitions in France
2003 in French sport
March 2003 sports events in France
International sports competitions hosted by France
Sport in Hautes-Alpes